Chhadmabeshi is a 1971 Bengali comedy film directed by Agradoot, starring Uttam Kumar and Madhabi Mukherjee as leads, based on the story Chhadobeshi by writer Upendranath Ganguly. The story revolves around a newly married professor, who plays a practical joke upon his brother-in-law by posing as his family driver. Music of the film composed by Sudhin Dasgupta. The film was remade in Hindi in 1975 as Chupke Chupke and in Kannada in 2004 as Joke Falls.

Plot
Abanish Sen (Uttam Kumar) is a Botany professor as well as newly married to Sulekha (Madhabi Chakroborty). When he comes to know that his brother-in-law, advocate Prasanta Ghosh (Bikash Roy), needs a driver at Allahabad where he stays with family, Abanish plans to play a practical joke upon them. As per his plan, he goes to Allahabad and is selected as the driver. Sometime later, Sulekha arrives at Allahabad and lies to Prasanta and her sister Labanya (Anuva Gupta) that being involved in some important work, Abanish will arrive after a few days. In the next few days, Prasanta and Labanya notice and are perturbed by the intimacy between the new driver and Sulekha. Suddenly, Sulekha and Gaurhari alias Abanish flee without informing anyone. At the same time, Abanish's friend Subimal (Subhendu) arrives posing as Abanish, quite angry at the absence of his wife, further irking Prasanta Ghosh.

Cast
 Uttam Kumar as Abanish alias Gourhari 
 Madhabi Mukherjee as Sulekha 
 Bikash Roy as Prashanta
 Subhendu Chatterjee as Subimal
Tarun Kumar as Binoy
 Anubha Gupta as Labanya
 Jyotsna Biswas as Basudha
 Ashok Mitra as Haripada
 Jahor Roy as Mosaheb Lal (Driver)
 Samita Biswas as Latika

Soundtrack

Reception
Times Of India wrote that This is a evergreen classic comedy with perfect comic timing make it ideal to watching anytime. 

The film become super hit at the box office and ran for 126 days in theaters at Kolkata.

Remakes
The film is remade in Hindi in 1975 as Chupke Chupke directed by the legendary Hrishikesh Mukherjee, starring Dharmendra, Sharmila Tagore and Amitabh Bachchan. It's remade again in Kannada in 2004 as Joke Falls

Notes

References

External links
 

1971 comedy films
1971 films
Bengali films remade in other languages
Indian comedy films
Bengali-language Indian films
1970s Bengali-language films